This is a list of National Basketball Association players whose last names begin with C.

The list also includes players from the American National Basketball League (NBL), the Basketball Association of America (BAA), and the original American Basketball Association (ABA). All of these leagues contributed to the formation of the present-day NBA.

Individuals who played in the NBL prior to its 1949 merger with the BAA are listed in italics, as they are not traditionally listed in the NBA's official player registers.

C

Žarko Čabarkapa
Barney Cable
Soup Cable
Bruno Caboclo
Devontae Cacok
Jason Caffey
Michael Cage
Jamal Cain
Gerry Calabrese
Nick Calathes
Jose Calderon
Adrian Caldwell
Jim Caldwell
Joe Caldwell
Kentavious Caldwell-Pope
Bill Calhoun
Corky Calhoun
Bob Calihan
Demetrius Calip
Tom Callahan
Rick Calloway
Ernie Calverley
Mack Calvin
Dexter Cambridge
Marcus Camby
Joe Camic
Facundo Campazzo
Elden Campbell
Fred Campbell
Ken Campbell
Tony Campbell
Ed Campion
Isaiah Canaan
Vlatko Čančar
Devin Cannady
Larry Cannon
Clint Capela
Derrick Caracter
Frank Card
Brian Cardinal
Keith Carey
Vernon Carey Jr.
Howie Carl
Chet Carlisle
Geno Carlisle
Rick Carlisle
Don Carlos
Al Carlson
Don Carlson
Dan Carnevale
Bob Carney
Rodney Carney
Tony Carp
Bob Carpenter
Antoine Carr
Austin Carr
Chris Carr
Cory Carr
Kenny Carr
M. L. Carr
Darel Carrier
Bob Carrington
DeMarre Carroll
Joe Barry Carroll
Matt Carroll
Jimmy Carruth
Frank Carswell
Anthony Carter
Butch Carter
Fred Carter
George Carter
Howard Carter
Hugh Carter
Jake Carter
Jevon Carter
Maurice Carter
Reggie Carter
Ron Carter
Vince Carter
Wendell Carter Jr.
Michael Carter-Williams
Bill Cartwright
Jay Carty
Alex Caruso
Cornelius Cash
Sam Cash
Sam Cassell
Omri Casspi
Harvey Catchings
Terry Catledge
Sid Catlett
Kelvin Cato
Bobby Cattage
Willie Cauley-Stein
Troy Caupain
Duane Causwell
Tyler Cavanaugh
Ron Cavenall
Ahmad Caver
Cedric Ceballos
John Celestand
Al Cervi
Lionel Chalmers
Mario Chalmers
Bill Chamberlain
Wilt Chamberlain
Jerry Chambers
Tom Chambers
Julian Champagnie
Justin Champagnie
Mike Champion
Kennedy Chandler
Tyson Chandler
Wilson Chandler
Don Chaney
John Chaney
Rex Chapman
Wayne Chapman
Len Chappell
Ken Charles
Lorenzo Charles
Joe Chealey
Calbert Cheaney
Zylan Cheatham
Maurice Cheeks
Phil Chenier
Will Cherry
George Chestnut
Derrick Chievous
Pete Chilcutt
Josh Childress
Randolph Childress
Chris Childs
Chris Chiozza
Leroy Chollet
Jim Chones
Marquese Chriss
Fred Christ
Cal Christensen
Bob Christian 
Doug Christie
Max Christie
Dionte Christmas
Rakeem Christmas
Semaj Christon
Josh Christopher
Patrick Christopher
Steve Chubin
Chuck Chuckovits
Ralph Churchfield
Robert Churchwell
Hal Cihlar 
Archie Clark
Carlos Clark
Dick Clark
Earl Clark
Gary Clark
Ian Clark
Keon Clark
Brandon Clarke
Coty Clarke
Jordan Clarkson
Gian Clavell
Víctor Claver
John Clawson
Charles Claxton
Nic Claxton
Speedy Claxton
Jim Cleamons
Don Cleary
Mateen Cleaves
Barry Clemens
Chris Clemons
Antonius Cleveland
Nathaniel Clifton
Bill Closs
Keith Closs
Paul Cloyd
Bob Cluggish
Ben Clyde
Doyle Cofer
Amir Coffey
Richard Coffey
Fred Cofield
John Coker
Bobby Colburn
Norris Cole
Ben Coleman
Derrick Coleman
E. C. Coleman
Jack Coleman
Norris Coleman
Paul Coleman
Marv Colen
Bimbo Coles
Jason Collier
Art Collins
Don Collins
Doug Collins
James Collins
Jarron Collins
Jason Collins
Jimmy Collins
John Collins
Mardy Collins
Sherron Collins
Zach Collins
Kyle Collinsworth
Darren Collison
Nick Collison
Joe Colone
Bonzie Colson
Sean Colson
Steve Colter
Glen Combs
Leroy Combs
John Comeaux
Dallas Comegys
Jim Cominsky
Larry Comley
Jeff Congdon
Gene Conley
Larry Conley
Mike Conley Jr.
Ed Conlin
Marty Conlon
Pat Connaughton
Jimmy Dan Conner
Lester Conner
Chuck Connors
Will Conroy
Anthony Cook
Bert Cook
Bobby Cook
Brian Cook
Daequan Cook
Darwin Cook
Jeff Cook
Norm Cook 
Omar Cook
Quinn Cook
Ted Cook
Tyler Cook
Charles Cooke
David Cooke
Joe Cooke
Xavier Cooks
Jack Cooley
Chuck Cooper
Duane Cooper
Joe Cooper
Michael Cooper
Sharife Cooper
Wayne Cooper
Tom Copa
Robert Cope
Chris Copeland
Hollis Copeland
Lanard Copeland
Tyrone Corbin
Chris Corchiani
Ken Corley
Ray Corley
Petr Cornelie
Dave Corzine
Ed Costain
Larry Costello
Matt Costello
Bob Cotton
Bryce Cotton
Jack Cotton
James Cotton
John Coughran
Mel Counts
Steve Courtin
Joe Courtney
Marcus Cousin
DeMarcus Cousins
Bob Cousy
Bill Coven
Robert Covington
Dave Cowens
Chubby Cox
Johnny Cox
Wesley Cox
Allen Crabbe
Torrey Craig
Gene Cramer
Chris Crawford
Freddie Crawford
Jamal Crawford
Joe Crawford
Jordan Crawford
Mitch Creek
Jim Creighton
Ron Crevier
Harold Crisler
Joe Crispin
Charlie Criss
Russ Critchfield
Winston Crite
Javaris Crittenton
Dillard Crocker
Bobby Croft
Geoff Crompton
Terry Crosby
Austin Croshere
Jeff Cross
Pete Cross
Russell Cross
Chink Crossin
John Crotty
Bill Crow
Mark Crow
Corey Crowder
Jae Crowder
George Crowe
Leo Crowe
Kieran Crowley
Freddie Crum
Al Cueto
Marty Cullen
Jarrett Culver
Duke Cumberland
Jarron Cumberland
Pat Cummings
Terry Cummings
Vonteego Cummings
Billy Cunningham
Cade Cunningham
Cookie Cunningham
Dante Cunningham
Dick Cunningham
Jared Cunningham
William Cunningham
Radisav Ćurčić
Armand Cure
Earl Cureton
Bill Curley
Fran Curran
Jim Currie
Dell Curry
Eddy Curry
JamesOn Curry
Michael Curry
Seth Curry
Stephen Curry
Rastko Cvetković
Walt Czarnecki

References
  NBA & ABA Players with Last Names Starting with C @ basketball-reference.com
 NBL Players with Last Names Starting with C @ basketball-reference.com

CB